Jeffrey Duncan Jones (born September 28, 1946) is an American character actor, best known for his roles as Emperor Joseph II in Amadeus (1984), Edward R. Rooney in Ferris Bueller's Day Off (1986), Charles Deetz in Beetlejuice (1988), Dr. Skip Tyler in The Hunt for Red October (1990), Eddie Barzoon in The Devil's Advocate (1997), and A. W. Merrick in both Deadwood (2004–2006) and Deadwood: The Movie (2019). His career started in Guthrie Theater in Minneapolis, Minnesota, and advanced to London and Broadway. In film and television, Jones has had many roles which capitalized on his deadpan portrayal of characters in unusual situations, often to comic effect. He was nominated for a Golden Globe Award for his performance in Amadeus and a Screen Actors Guild Award as part of the ensemble cast of Deadwood.

In 2003, Jones pleaded no contest to a charge of soliciting a minor to pose for nude photographs and had subsequent arrests for failing to update his sex offender status.

Early life 
Jones was born in Buffalo, New York, the son of Ruth (née Schooley) and Douglas Bennett Jones. His mother was an art historian, who urged him towards a career in acting. His father died when Jones was an infant.

Early career
After graduating from The Putney School in 1964, Jones enrolled in Lawrence University as a premed student, where his performances in university productions brought him to the attention of Tyrone Guthrie, who recruited him for the Guthrie Theater in Minneapolis, Minnesota. He then went to London in 1969 to study at the London Academy of Music and Dramatic Art, followed by a three-year stint with the Stratford Theatre in Stratford, Ontario.

His stage career included more than 125 productions, starting with the Guthrie Theater, then internationally in South America, Canada, and London, and in New York Off-Broadway in Cloud 9 and Henry V, among other productions, as well as on Broadway in productions including Trelawny of the 'Wells' and The Elephant Man. His transition from stage to film began in 1970.

Film and television career
Jones began acting in small parts in film and television in the 1970s. In his best-known roles as Emperor Joseph II in Amadeus, Charles Deetz in Beetlejuice, and Edward R. Rooney in Ferris Bueller's Day Off, his dead-pan expression and distinctive face bring a comic flavor to his characters through their reactions to the situations in which they find themselves, more so than the wit in their scripted lines. The New York Times biographic profile says of Jones, "Although he has tried to steer clear of playing only sinister roles, the actor's imposing height, bugged-out eyes, easy sneer, and shock of reddish-blond hair give him vaguely devilish features that have prompted villain typecasting. However, the actor is also widely respected and considered a boon wherever he appears." The profile describes his portrayals variously as a "hissable, cartoonish high school principal" in Ferris Bueller's Day Off, a "good-natured father" in Beetlejuice, "an interplanetary freedom fighter" in Mom and Dad Save the World, a "demon stand-in" in Stay Tuned, and "evil bespectacled twins" in Out on a Limb.

Jones' work in the Lucille Lortel Theatre production of Cloud 9 was noticed by the casting team of Easy Money (1983), earning Jones a supporting role opposite Rodney Dangerfield.

Amadeus
Cloud 9 further attracted the attention of director Miloš Forman, who cast Jones as Joseph II, Holy Roman Emperor in Amadeus (1984), an adaptation of the Peter Shaffer play of the same name. Critic James Berardinelli noted that Jones portrayed the Emperor "as a superficial and self-absorbed ruler who can't tell the difference between a great opera and a mediocre one". Vincent Canby of The New York Times praised Jones's performance, citing the film's most memorable line, when the Emperor complains of Die Entführung aus dem Serail that "there are too many notes". Jones' work earned him a nomination for the Golden Globe Award for Best Supporting Actor – Motion Picture.

Ferris Bueller's Day Off
Jones' performance as Edward R. Rooney in the film Ferris Bueller's Day Off (1986) made him a cultural icon. Rooney, self-important and obsessed with catching the chronic truant Ferris Bueller, became a symbol of pomposity and authoritarian hatefulness. The New York Times review characterized Jones' performance as having "fine cartoon like ferocity", wherein his character "gets scratched, bitten, attacked by ferocious dogs and covered with mud while pursuing his weaker, but craftier prey, and emerges each time bruised but undaunted, thinking up some new (and futile) plan." The review likened Jones' role as akin to that of Wile E. Coyote as a character who is fated to be unable to catch The Road Runner (Ferris Bueller). Jones expressed concern about being remembered more for this role than for Amadeus. He further said, regarding the film's premise, "What's amazing about Ferris Bueller, is that we're asked to, and do, sympathise with a kid whose only complaint in life is that his sister got a car for her birthday and he got a computer."

Beetlejuice and Tim Burton
In the horror comedy film Beetlejuice (1988), Jones and Catherine O'Hara portrayed a married couple (Charles and Delia Deetz) who unwittingly become co-owners of a haunted house. To highlight this couple's status as boors, director Tim Burton cast Dick Cavett and Robert Goulet to appear as their guests at a dinner party, at which the ghosts of the previous owners cause everyone to sing "Day-O (The Banana Boat Song)".

Jones collaborated with Burton again on the films Ed Wood (1994), in which he portrays The Amazing Criswell, and Sleepy Hollow (1999). Shortly prior to the release of Sleepy Hollow, Jones said of Burton, "I've known Tim now for quite some time and really enjoy working with him. I like his sensibility, and he's great fun."

Other films
Jones played Dr. Walter Jenning in the George Lucas film Howard the Duck (1986). He portrayed Inspector Lestrade in the Sherlock Holmes spoof film Without a Clue (1988). In The Hunt for Red October (1990), he played ex-submarine commander Skip Tyler, who identifies the Red October's propulsion system to Alec Baldwin's Jack Ryan. He also appeared as real-life figure Thomas Putnam in The Crucible (1996). He also played Uncle Crenshaw Little in Stuart Little (1999). As lumber mogul Joe Potter, Jones was the primary antagonist of the Eddie Murphy comedy Dr. Dolittle 2 (2001).

Television roles
One of Jones' earliest television roles was in an episode of the short-lived CBS series Sara (1976). He showcased his villain persona as the sinister Mister Acme (owner of Acme Toxic Waste) in the satirical comedy miniseries Fresno (1986), starring Carol Burnett, Charles Grodin and Dabney Coleman. For Disney, Jones hosted the 1987 D-TV Monster Hits musical special (as the Magic Mirror) and later co-starred with Tyra Banks, Kathy Najimy and Kevin Pollak in the video storyline portion of the Walt Disney World attraction ExtraTERRORestrial Alien Encounter, a staple of Tomorrowland from 1995 to 2003. He has had guest roles on a number of television series, including Amazing Stories, Tales from the Crypt and Batman: The Animated Series. He was the star of another short-lived CBS program: sitcom The People Next Door (1989), portraying a cartoonist whose imagination could make things come to life.

Jones' most prominent television role is that of newspaper publisher A. W. Merrick on the acclaimed HBO drama series Deadwood (2004–2006). Keith Uhlich of Slant Magazine referred to both Jones and the character of Merrick as "perversely appropriate additions" to the program, further citing Merrick as its "secular soul". Along with the ensemble cast, Jones was nominated for the Screen Actors Guild Award for Outstanding Performance by an Ensemble in a Drama Series.

Later career
Subsequent to his legal troubles, Jones has become progressively less active as a performer. Following his appearance in the golf comedy Who's Your Caddy? (2007), he was absent from film and television for several years. He returned with an uncredited cameo as Collier's editor Charles Colebaugh in the Emmy-nominated HBO original film Hemingway & Gellhorn (2012), followed by the supporting role of scientist Gladstone in the independent disaster film 10.0 Earthquake (2014). Jones went on to play a fictional version of himself in the short film 7 Days (2016) and reprised the role of A. W. Merrick in Deadwood: The Movie.

In May 2015, Jones returned to the stage with the New American Theatre production of 63 Trillion, directed by Steve Zuckerman. The Los Angeles Times praised his portrayal of financial adviser Dick as having "malevolent gusto that Satan himself might envy." Beginning in March 2018, Jones portrayed ailing patriarch Bradley in a production of the A. R. Gurney play The Cocktail Hour, staged at the Annenberg Theater in the Palm Springs Art Museum.

Personal life
Jones has one son, actor Julian Coutts, whose mother was Lloy Coutts (1941–2008), a Canadian voice coach. She and Jones met in Stratford, Ontario.

One interviewer found Jones to value anonymity and the enjoyment of everyday tasks, like home repairs, and found him to be uninterested in status symbols and fan adulation. In that 1989 interview, Jones pointed out that greater public recognition actually makes it more difficult to transition between roles and allow the character to come to the fore and the actor to recede from view.

On October 13, 2020, Jones spoke virtually with Suzanna Bowling of the Times Square Chronicles, in an interview for The Lambs. Topics of discussion included Jones' path to acting and early theater career, as well as projects including Ferris Bueller's Day Off, Beetlejuice, Howard the Duck and Deadwood.

Criminal offenses
In 2002, Jones was arrested for possession of child pornography and accused by a 17-year-old boy of solicitation to pose for nude photographs. He pleaded no contest to a charge of soliciting a minor, as the accuser was 14 when the offense first occurred. At the same time, the misdemeanor charge of possession of child pornography was dropped. His attorney emphasized that there was no allegation of improper physical contact. His punishment was five years' probation, counseling, and the requirement to register as a sex offender.

Jones was arrested twice for failing to update his sex offender status, first in Florida in 2004, and then six years later in California. In 2006, Jones' record became the subject of community complaint during production of Who's Your Caddy? in Aiken, South Carolina. Upon learning of his involvement, locals insisted that the public should have been alerted, considering that families were being invited to visit the set. Surrounding the release of Deadwood: The Movie, Jones' crime was noted by the media.

Filmography

Film

Television

Other works

References

External links

 New York Times biography of Jeffrey Jones
 

1946 births
Living people
20th-century American male actors
21st-century American male actors
Alumni of the London Academy of Music and Dramatic Art
American expatriates in England
American male film actors
American male television actors
American male voice actors
Lawrence University alumni
Male actors from Buffalo, New York
Male actors from Los Angeles
The Putney School alumni